Snow Lake is an unincorporated community in northeast Desha County, Arkansas, United States. Snow Lake has a post office with ZIP code 72379.

References

Unincorporated communities in Desha County, Arkansas
Unincorporated communities in Arkansas